Patrick "Wedger" Meagher (1890-1958) was an Irish hurler who played as a corner-back for the Tipperary senior team.

Born in Toomevara, County Tipperary, Meagher first arrived on the inter-county scene at the age of twenty when he first linked up with the Tipperary junior team. He made his senior debut during the 1912 championship. Meagher went on to play a key part for Tipperary for a brief period, and won one Munster medal. He was an All-Ireland runner-up on one occasion.

At club level Meagher won six championship medals with Toomevara.

His retirement came following the conclusion of the 1919 championship.

In retirement from playing, Meagher became involved in team management and administrative affairs. He was a selector with the Tipperary senior team and served as secretary of the Tipperary County Board.

Honours

Team

Toomevara
Tipperary Senior Hurling Championship (6): 1910, 1912, 1913, 1914, 1919, 1923

Tipperary
Munster Senior Hurling Championship (1): 1913
Croke Cup (1): 1913

References

1890 births
1958 deaths
Toomevara hurlers
Tipperary inter-county hurlers
Hurling selectors